Umberto I (14 March 1844 – 29 July 1900) was King of Italy from 9 January 1878 until his assassination in 1900.

Umberto's reign saw Italy attempt colonial expansion into the Horn of Africa, successfully gaining Eritrea and Somalia despite being defeated by Abyssinia at the Battle of Adwa in 1896. In 1882, he approved the Triple Alliance with the German Empire and Austria-Hungary.

He was deeply loathed in leftist circles for his conservatism and support of the Bava Beccaris massacre in Milan. He was especially hated by anarchists, who attempted to assassinate him during the first year of his reign. He was killed by another anarchist, Gaetano Bresci, two years after the Bava Beccaris massacre.

Youth

The son of Victor Emmanuel II and Archduchess Adelaide of Austria, Umberto was born in Turin, which was then capital of The Kingdom of Piedmont-Sardinia, on 14 March 1844, his father's 24th birthday. His education was entrusted to, among others, Massimo Taparelli, Marquess d'Azeglio, and Pasquale Stanislao Mancini. As Crown Prince, Umberto was distrusted by his father, who gave him no training in politics or constitutional government, and he was brought up with no affection or love. Instead, Umberto was taught to be obedient and loyal; had to stand at attention whenever his father entered the room; and when speaking to his father had to get down on his knees to kiss his hand first. The fact that Umberto had to kiss his father's hand before being allowed to speak to him both in public and in private right up to his father's death contributed much to the tension between the two.

From March 1858, he had a military career in the Royal Sardinian Army, beginning with the rank of captain. Umberto took part in the Italian Wars of Independence: he was present at the battle of Solferino in 1859, and in 1866 commanded the XVI Division at the Villafranca battle that followed the Italian defeat at Custoza.

Because of the upheaval the Savoys caused to a number of other royal houses (all the Italian ones, and those related closely to them, such as the Bourbons of Spain and France) in 1859–60, only a minority of royal families in the 1860s were willing to establish relations with the newly founded Italian royal family. It proved difficult to find any royal bride for either of the sons of king Victor Emmanuel II (his younger son Amedeo, Umberto's brother, married ultimately a Piedmontese subject, princess Vittoria of Cisterna). Their conflict with the papacy did not help these matters. Not many eligible Catholic royal brides were easily available for young Umberto.

At first, Umberto was to marry Archduchess Mathilde of Austria, a scion of a remote sideline of the Austrian imperial house; however, she died as the result of an accident at the age of 18. On 21 April 1868, Umberto married his first cousin, Margherita Teresa Giovanna, Princess of Savoy. Their only son was Victor Emmanuel, prince of Naples. While Umberto was to be described by a modern historian as "a colorless and physically unimpressive man, of limited intellect" Margherita's appearance, cultural interests and strong personality were to enhance the popularity of the monarchy. Umberto kept many mistresses on the side, and his favorite mistress, Eugenia, the wife of Duke Litta Visconti-Arese, lived with him at his court as his common-law wife as he forced Queen Margherita to accept her as a lady-in-waiting.

In 1876, when the British Foreign Secretary, Lord Salisbury, visited Rome, he reported to London that King Victor Emmanuel II and Crown Prince Umberto were "at war with each other". Upon taking the Crown, Umberto dismissed all of his father's friends from the court, sold off his father's racing horse collection (which numbered 1,000 horses) and cut down on extravagances to pay down the debts Victor Emmanuel II had run up. The British historian Denis Mack Smith commented that it was sign of the great wealth of the House of Savoy that Umberto was able to pay off his father's debts without having to ask parliament for assistance. Like his father, Umberto was a poorly educated man without intellectual or artistic interests, never read any books, and preferred to dictate rather than write letters as he found writing to be too mentally taxing. After meeting him, Queen Victoria described Umberto as having his father's "gruff, abrupt manner of speaking", but without his "rough speech and manners". In contrast, Queen Margherita was widely read in all the classics of European literature, kept up a salon of intellectuals, and despite the fact that French was her first language was often praised for her beautiful Italian in her letters and when speaking.

Reign

Accession to the throne and first assassination attempt
Ascending the throne on the death of his father (9 January 1878), Umberto adopted the title "Umberto I of Italy" rather than "Umberto IV" (of Savoy), and consented that the remains of his father should be interred at Rome in the Pantheon, rather than the royal mausoleum of Basilica of Superga. While on a tour of the kingdom, accompanied by Queen Margherita and the Prime Minister Benedetto Cairoli, he was attacked with a dagger by an anarchist, Giovanni Passannante, during a parade in Naples on 17 November 1878. The King warded off the blow with his sabre, but Cairoli, in attempting to defend him, was severely wounded in the thigh. The would-be assassin was condemned to death, even though the law only allowed the death penalty if the King was killed. Passanante would die three decades later in a psychiatric institution.

Foreign policy

In foreign policy Umberto I approved the Triple Alliance with Austria-Hungary and the German Empire, repeatedly visiting Vienna and Berlin. Many in Italy, however, viewed with hostility an alliance with their former Austrian enemies, who were still occupying areas claimed by Italy. A strong militarist, Umberto loved Prussian-German militarism and on his visits to Germany his favorite activity was to review the Prussian Army and he was greatly honored to be allowed to lead a Prussian hussar regiment on field maneuvers outside of Frankfurt. Emperor Wilhelm II of Germany told him during one visit that he should strengthen the Regio Esercito to the point that he could abolish parliament and rule Italy as a dictator.   

A major criticism of the policies carried out by the Prime Ministers appointed by Umberto was the continued power of organized crime in the Mezzogiorno (southern Italy) with the Mafia dominating Sicily and the Camorra dominating Campania. Both the Mafia and the Camorra functioned as "parallel states" whose existence and power was tolerated by successive governments in Rome as both the Mafia and the Camorra engaged in electoral fraud and voter intimidation so effective that it was Mafia and Camorra bosses who decided who won elections. As it was impossible to win elections in the Mezzogiorno without the support of organized crime, politicians cut deals with the bosses of the Camorra and Mafia to exchange toleration of their criminal activities for votes. The Mezzogiorno was the most backward region of Italy with high levels of poverty, emigration and an illiteracy rate estimated as high as 70%. The deputies from the Mezzogiorno always voted against more schools for the Mezzogiorno, thus perpetuating southern backwardness and poverty as both the Mafia and the Camorra were opposed to any sort of social reform that might threaten their power. However, the king preferred heavy military spending rather than engaging in social reforms and every year, the Italian state spent 10 times more money on the military than on education. Umberto, an aggressive proponent of militarism, once said that to accept cuts in the military budget would be "an abject scandal and we might as well give up politics altogether". At least part of the reason why Umberto was so opposed to cutting the military budget was because he personally promised Emperor Wilhelm II that Italy would send 5 army corps to Germany in the event of a war with France, a promise that the king did not see fit to share with his prime ministers.  

Umberto was also favorably disposed towards the policy of colonial expansion inaugurated in 1885 by the occupation of Massawa in Eritrea. Italy expanded into Somalia in the 1880s as well. Umberto's preferred solution to the problems of Italy was to conquer Ethiopia, regardless of overwhelming public opposition, and supported the ultra-imperialist Prime Minister Francesco Crispi who in May 1895 spoke of "the absolute impossibility of continuing to govern through Parliament." In December 1893, Umberto appointed Crispi prime minister despite his "shattered reputation" due to his involvement in the Banca Romana scandal together with numerous other scandals that the king himself called "sordid". As Crispi was heavily in debt, the king secretly agreed to pay off his debts in exchange for Crispi following the king's advice.

Umberto openly called Parliament a "bad joke" and refused to allow Parliament to meet again lest Crispi faced difficult questions about the Banca Romana scandal. Crispi only avoided indictment because of his parliamentary immunity. When the king was warned that it was dangerous for the crown to support someone like Crispi, Umberto replied that "Crispi is a pig, but a necessary pig", who despite his corruption, had to stay in power for "the national interest, which is the only thing that matters". With the support of the king, Crispi governed in an authoritarian manner, preferring to pass legislation by having the king issue royal decrees as opposed to getting bills passed by Parliament. On 25 June 1895 Crispi refused to allow a parliamentary inquiry into the bank scandal, saying as a prime minister he was above the law because he had "served Italy for 53 years". Umberto I was suspected of aspiring to a vast empire in north-east Africa, a suspicion which tended somewhat to diminish his popularity after the disastrous Battle of Adwa in Ethiopia on 1 March 1896. After the Battle of Adwa, public frustration with the deeply unpopular war with Ethiopia came to the fore, and demonstrations broke out in Rome with people shouting "death to the king!" and "long live the republic!". 

Despite the defeat at Adwa, Umberto still harbored imperialistic ambitions towards Ethiopia, saying: "I am what they call a warmonger and my personal wish would be to strike back at Menelik and avenge our defeat." In 1897, the prime minister, Antonio Starabba, Marchese di Rudinì tried to sell Eritrea to Belgium on the grounds that Eritrea was too expensive to hold onto, but was overruled by the king who insisted that Eritrea must stay Italian. Rudinì attempted to reduce military spending, citing a study showing that since 1861 military spending constituted over half the budget every year, but was again blocked by the king. In 1899, Foreign Minister Felice Napoleone Canevaro dispatched a Regia Marina squadron to China with an ultimatum demanding that the Chinese government hand over a coastal city to be ruled as an Italian concession in the same manner as other Western imperial powers in China. Prime Minister Luigi Pelloux and his fellow cabinet ministers stated that Canevaro had acted without informing them, and it was widely believed that the king was the one who given Canevaro the orders to acquire a concession in China. After the Chinese government refused, Canevaro threatened war, but was forced to back down and settled for breaking diplomatic relations with China.  

In the summer of 1900, Italian forces were part of the Eight-Nation Alliance which participated in the Boxer Rebellion in Imperial China. Through the Boxer Protocol, signed after Umberto's death, the Kingdom of Italy gained a concession territory in Tientsin.

Umberto's attitude towards the Holy See was uncompromising. In an 1886 telegram, he declared Rome "untouchable" and affirmed the permanence of the Italian possession of the "Eternal City".

Turmoil

The reign of Umberto I was a time of social upheaval, though it was later claimed to have been a tranquil belle époque. Social tensions mounted as a consequence of the relatively recent occupation of the Kingdom of the Two Sicilies, the spread of socialist ideas, public hostility to the colonialist plans of the various governments, especially Crispi's, and the numerous crackdowns on civil liberties. The protesters included the young Benito Mussolini, then a member of the socialist party. On 22 April 1897, Umberto I was attacked again, by an unemployed ironsmith, Pietro Acciarito, who tried to stab him near Rome.

Bava Beccaris massacre

During the colonial wars in Africa, large demonstrations over the rising price of bread were held in Italy and on 7 May 1898, the city of Milan was put under military rule by General Fiorenzo Bava Beccaris, who ordered rifle-fire and artillery against the demonstrators. As a result, 82 people were killed according to the authorities, with opposition sources claiming that the death toll was 400 dead with 2,000 wounded. King Umberto sent a telegram to congratulate Bava Beccaris on the restoration of order and later decorated him with the medal of Great Official of Savoy Military Order, greatly outraging a large part of the public opinion.

Assassination

On the evening of 29 July 1900, Umberto was assassinated in Monza. The king was shot four times by the Italian-American anarchist Gaetano Bresci. Bresci claimed he wanted to avenge the people killed in Milan during the suppression of the riots of May 1898. 

Umberto was buried in the Pantheon in Rome, by the side of his father Victor Emmanuel II, on 9 August 1900. He was the last Savoy to be buried there, as his son and successor Victor Emmanuel III died in exile and was buried in Egypt until his remains were transferred to Vicoforte near Cuneo in 2017.

American anarchist Leon F. Czolgosz claimed that the assassination of Umberto I was his inspiration to kill President William McKinley in September 1901.

Honours

Italian
 Knight of the Annunciation, 30 January 1859; Grand Master, 9 January 1878
 Grand Cross of Saints Maurice and Lazarus, 30 January 1859; Grand Master, 9 January 1878
 Gold Medal of Military Valour, 1866
 Grand Master of the Military Order of Savoy
 Grand Master of the Order of the Crown of Italy
 Grand Master of the Civil Order of Savoy
 Commemorative Medal of Campaigns of Independence Wars
 Commemorative Medal of the Unity of Italy

Foreign

Ancestry

References

External links

 External link: Genealogy of recent members of the House of Savoy

1844 births
1900 deaths
1900 murders in Italy
19th-century kings of Italy
19th-century kings of Sardinia
19th-century murdered monarchs
Nobility from Turin
Italian monarchs
Italian princes
Roman Catholic monarchs
Princes of Savoy
Recipients of the Pour le Mérite (military class)
Extra Knights Companion of the Garter
Knights of the Golden Fleece of Austria
Grand Crosses of the Order of Saint Stephen of Hungary
3
3
3
Laureate Cross of Saint Ferdinand
Italian people of Polish descent
Claimant Kings of Jerusalem
Deaths by firearm in Italy
Male murder victims
Kings of Italy (1861–1946)
Grand Masters of the Gold Medal of Military Valor
Burials at the Pantheon, Rome
Victor Emmanuel II of Italy